Crossostephium is a monotypic genus of flowering plants in the family Asteraceae. The only species is Crossostephium chinense native to parts of Japan (Kazan-retto, Nansei-shoto), Taiwan, Guangdong, Indochina, Peninsular Malaysia, and the Philippines.

References

Monotypic Asteraceae genera
Anthemideae
Flora of Asia